Ian Powell may refer to:

 Ian Powell (footballer)
 Ian Powell (swimmer)
 Ian Powell (businessperson)